Tetillidae is a family of marine sponges.
Tetillids are more or less spherical sponges (sometimes referred to as golf ball sponges) which are found commonly in all marine habitats at all depths throughout the world. They are especially common in sedimented habitats. Over a hundred species have been described in ten genera.

Reproduction 
Reproduction in tetillids is quite varied, although free-swimming larvae have not been seen in this group. In some species fertilized eggs are released which settle directly onto the substrate and develop in situ. In other species the eggs develop within the body cavity of the adult sponge and are released as small adult sponges via localized breakdown of the pinacoderm.

Genera 

 Acanthotetilla Burton, 1959
 Amphitethya Lendenfeld, 1907
 Antarctotetilla Carella, Agell, Cárdenas & Uriz, 2016
 Cinachyra Sollas, 1886
 Cinachyrella Wilson, 1925
 Craniella Schmidt, 1870
 Fangophilina Schmidt, 1880
 Levantiniella Carella, Agell, Cárdenas & Uriz, 2016 
 Paratetilla Dendy, 1905
 Tetilla Schmidt, 1868

References

Systema Porifera

Tetractinellida